Vatican Taekwondo  is the official governing body for the sport of taekwondo in the Vatican City.

History
Vatican Taekwando became the 211th member of World Taekwondo in November 2021. Vatican Taewkondo was the second sports federation from Vatican City to gain official membership of its sport's world governing body.

See also
Vatican Athletics
Sport in Vatican City

References

Sport in Vatican City